The 1991 NBL Finals was the championship series of the 1991 season of Australia's National Basketball League (NBL) and the conclusion of the season's playoffs. The Perth Wildcats defeated the Eastside Spectres in three games (2-1) for their second NBL championship.

Format
The 1991 National Basketball League Finals started on 25 September and concluded on 27 October. The playoffs consisted of two best of three Elimination finals, two best of three Semi-finals and the best of three game Grand Final series. As the two top teams at the end of the regular season, Perth and Eastside both qualified for home court advantage during the Semi-finals.

Qualification

Qualified teams

Ladder
This is the ladder at the end of season, before the finals. The top 6 teams qualified for the finals series.

The NBL tie-breaker system as outlined in the NBL Rules and Regulations states that in the case of an identical win–loss record, the results in games played between the teams will determine order of seeding.

1Head-to-Head between Eastside Spectres and Geelong Supercats (1-1). Eastside Spectres won For and Against(+1). 

23-way Head-to-Head between Adelaide 36ers (3-1), Melbourne Tigers (2-2) and North Melbourne Giants (1-3). 

3Head-to-Head between Sydney Kings and Gold Coast Rollers (1-1). Sydney Kings won For and Against (+8). 

4Head-to-Head between Canberra Cannons and Southern Melbourne Saints (1-1). Canberra Cannons won For and Against (+44).

Elimination finals

(4) Adelaide 36ers vs (5) Melbourne Tigers

Game 1

Game 2

(3) Geelong Supercats vs (6) North Melbourne Giants

Game 1

Game 2

Game 3

Semi-finals

(2) Eastside Spectres vs (6) North Melbourne Giants

Game 1

Game 2

(1) Perth Wildcats vs (4) Adelaide 36ers

Game 1

Game 2

Grand Final series

(1) Perth Wildcats vs (2) Eastside Spectres

Game 1

Game 2

Game 3

See also
 1991 NBL season

References

Finals
National Basketball League (Australia) Finals